Chrysocrambus linetella is a species of moth in the family Crambidae.

Subspecies
Chrysocrambus linetella linetella (Europe, Transcaucasia, Asia Minor, Syria, Jordan, Iran, Turkestan)
Chrysocrambus linetella caspicus (Caradja, 1910) (Armenia)
Chrysocrambus linetella pseudocraterellus Bleszynski, 1958 (Iraq, Iran)

Distribution
This species can be found in Great Britain, France, Spain, Switzerland, Austria, Italy, Slovakia, Hungary, Croatia, Bosnia and Herzegovina, Albania, Montenegro, the Republic of North Macedonia, Greece, Bulgaria and Romania, Transcaucasia, Asia Minor, Armenia, Syria, Jordan, Iraq, Iran and Turkmenistan.

Description
The wingspan is 20–27 mm. The basic color of the upperside forewings is whitish, with several longitudinal brown lines and two transverse brown lines.

It is very similar to Chrysocrambus craterella, but it can be distinguished by the less curved course of the median line and by the lack at the apex of the forewings of a double soft brown line. It could be overlooked as Thisanotia chrysonuchella.

Biology
Adults are on wing from June to the end of August in one generation per year. The larvae feed on roots of grasses (Poaceae species).

References

Bibliography
Bassi, G. 1985: Contributo allo studio delle Crambinae (Lepidoptera, Pyralidae). I: Specie mediterranee nuove o interessanti. – Bollettino del Museo Regionale di Scienze Naturali Torino 3 (1): 73–78.
Bleszynski, S. 1958: Studies on the Crambidae (Lepidoptera). Part XVIII. Revision of the genus Chrysocrambus Blesz. – Acta Zoologica Cracoviensia 2 (34): 845–885.
Bradley, J.D.Checklist of Lepidoptera Recorded from The British Isles, Second Edition (Revised) (2000)
Goater, B. – British Pyralid Moths – A Guide to their Identification (1986)
Heppner, J. B. (1982): Dates of selected Lepidoptera literature for the western hemisphere fauna. — Journal of the Lepidopterologists' Society 36 (2): 87–111.

External links

 Moths and Butterflies of Europe and North Africa
  Lepiforum.de

Crambinae
Moths described in 1781
Moths of Asia
Moths of Europe
Taxa named by Johan Christian Fabricius